Maggy Goyette is a French Canadian retired professional wrestler, better known by her ring name, Kalamity.  She primarily wrestled for nCw Femmes Fatales and is a former nCw Femmes Fatales Champion.

Professional wrestling career

Early career
Goyette fell into the world of wrestling by accident, after attending a show with a former boyfriend she became hooked and started to manage wrestlers and eventually started training to become a professional wrestler. She made her debut within six months. In her early career Goyette wrestled for Great Championship Wrestling (GCW) under the name Malicia Kalamity and went on to capture the GCW Women's Championship on two occasions. She also appeared for other wrestling promotions based in the Quebec area and even had a one off appearance in Jersey All Pro Wrestling losing to LuFisto in a number one contender's match for the JAPW Women's Championship.

nCw Femmes Fatales (2009–2014)

Goyette made her ring debut for nCw Femmes Fatales on September 5, 2009 and defeated Anna Minoushka and Mary Lee Rose and Roxie Cotton. At nCw Femmes Fatales II, she faced Cheerleader Melissa; however during the match Cat Power came out and beat down Melissa, LuFisto made the save and set up and match between Kalamity and Power vs Melissa and LuFisto which the latter team won. At nCw Femmes Fatales III Kalamity took on Sweet Cherrie in the first round of nCw Femmes Fatales Championship tournament and won. At nCw Femmes Fetales IV, Kalamity lost to LuFisto in the semifinal of the tournament. With this loss, Kalamity lost matches at nCw Femmes Fatales, first she lost to Mercedes Martinez at nCw Femmes Fatales V and again at nCw Femmes Fatales VI in a tag match which also included Cheerleader Melissa and Portia Perez. Even with that string of losses, Kalamity took on LuFisto for the nCw Femmes Fatales Champion and successfully ended her year-long reign and became the second champion. Over the next nCw Femmes Fatales shows, Kalamity has successfully defended her championship against strong opposition such as Sara Del Rey. Kalamity has also defended her championship at other promotions such as Women Superstars Uncensored and Pro Wrestling Superstars. On March 30, 2013 at Femmes Fatales XI Kalamity was defeated by challenger Mercedes Martinez and lost her championship after a 538-day reign as title holder.

Shimmer Women Athletes (2011–2013)
Kalamity made her debut for Shimmer Women Athletes on October 1, 2011, at Shimmer Volume 41 and was defeated by Hailey Hatred, however, she did gain the respect of Hatred and the two teamed up at Shimmer Volume 42 to lose to Melanie Cruise and Mena Libra. The following day Kalamity scored her first victory in Shimmer against Tomoka Nakagawa in a singles match. At Shimmer Volume 46 on March 17, 2012, Kalamity and Hatred took on Ayako Hamada and Ayumi Kurihara for the Shimmer Tag Team Championship but lost. The pair wrestled together on other Shimmer Volumes with varying degrees of success. Kalamity's suffered another loss, this time to Christina Von Eerie and MsChif at Shimmer Volume 48.

At the next set of tapings, Kalamity faced Ayako Hamada but was pinned by her during Shimmer volume 49. During Shimmer volume 50, she was part of a four-way match with Christina Von Eerie, Ryo Mizunami & Cherry Bomb but lost after Von Eerie pinned Bomb. The following day she appeared in Shimmer volume 52 where she faced and pinned Sassy Stephie following a Kalamity Driver. On April 14, 2013, at Volume 56, Kalamity received her first shot at the Shimmer Championship, but was defeated by the defending champion, Cheerleader Melissa.

Retirement
In September 2014, LuFisto mentioned in an interview with WrestleTalk TV that Kalamity has retired from wrestling.

Championships and accomplishments
Great Championship Wrestling
GCW Women's Championship (2 times)
nCw Femmes Fatales
nCw Femmes Fatales Champion (1 time)
Pro Wrestling Illustrated
PWI ranked her #35 of the best 50 female singles wrestlers in the PWI Female 50 in 2012

References

Year of birth missing (living people)
21st-century professional wrestlers
Canadian female professional wrestlers
Living people
People from Granby, Quebec
Professional wrestlers from Quebec